Gabronthus is a genus of beetles belonging to the family Staphylinidae.

The genus has almost cosmopolitan distribution.

Species:
 Gabronthus allardi Levasseur, 1964 
 Gabronthus alluaudanus (Jeannel & Paulian, 1945)

References

Staphylinidae
Staphylinidae genera